Lion with a Snake (French: Lion au serpent) is an 1832 sculpture by Antoine-Louis Barye.
It measures .

The original plaster was exhibited at the Paris Salon of 1833 and is in the Museum of Fine Arts of Lyon.
The original cast was acquired by Louis Philippe I and - after being exhibited in the Tuileries Gardens from 1836 to 1911 - is now in the Louvre.  
A stone version is sited in the Tuileries.  

References

Sculptures of lions
Snakes in art
19th-century sculptures
Plaster sculptures
Bronze sculptures
Sculptures of the Louvre by French artists
Sculptures of the Museum of Fine Arts of Lyon